Riya Saira  is an Indian actress and dubbing artist in the Malayalam film Industry. She made her debut in 2012, through the Malayalam film 22 Female Kottayam. Saira was spotted by Aashiq Abu while shooting for her debut movie Shutter.  Abu wanted her to cut off her hair to look like the character, but she couldn't as the shoot for Shutter wasn't complete and so she wore a wig.
She got Kerala State film Award for best dubbing artist in 2020, For the film Ayyapanum Koshiyum.

Career
She participated in Surya TV's reality show, Big Break. She was into anchoring also. Later she entering into acting. She started dubbing from childhood.

Personal life
Riya Saira was born on 26 November 1992.

Filmography

As actress

As dubbing artist

Television 

 Endorsements
 Shama Spices

External links 

 IMDB

References 

1994 births
Living people
Actresses from Kerala
Actresses in Malayalam cinema
Indian film actresses
21st-century Indian actresses
Indian voice actresses